This is a list of characters from the Nickelodeon television series Mr. Meaty.

Mr. Meaty Staff   
Josh Redgrove: A 16-year-old cashier and employee at Mr. Meaty. (voice by Jamie Shannon)   
Parker Dinkleman: Josh Redgrove's best friend who works as a fry cook. (voiced by Jason Hopley)
Edward R. Carney: (Mr. Meaty is named after him) (voice by Marty Stelnick) He is the original founder and current owner of the Mr. Meaty chain. His body was cryogenically frozen in the freezer of Scaunchboro's Mr. Meaty until Parker and Josh found him and thawed him out. Now, he’s back to founding and owning the Mr. Meaty empire and bossing his employees around. He rides around a high-tech wheelchair that he uses to send an electric charge to the electric chip on Mr. Wink's head, mostly when he does something he doesn't like. His appearance is a parody of Colonel Sanders.   
Mr. Wink: (AKA Winklemeyer VI) The manager with an electric chip on the back of his head, he was once a kind and friendly individual, but Carney used an electric chip to turn him cold, bitter and robotic, as well as when he does something Carney doesn’t like. His great-great-great-grandfather from many generations ago signed a contract that forces him to work at Carney's side. He seems to have issues, hinted by dressing as a female customer in Noseferateens. Apparently, his opinion on being shocked is not as bad as it used to; in the first few times, he would respond with terror, but later, he seems to see it coming, as he responds with a sarcastic "Oh, here it comes." before being electrocuted.  In the episode "Buffalo Burrito", it's hinted that his mother is deceased. He is voiced by Troy Baker.
Lizzy: (Alien who only worked there for a short time) She was cleverly disguised as an attractive young woman, being crushed on by both Josh and Parker for a short time. She only came out in "I Love Lizzy."   
Chip 2.6: First seen in Model Employee. He’s a robot, built to be the perfect Mr. Meaty employee. He was befriended by Josh, who thought he was cool, but Parker despised him when he saw the robot's taking their job coming. He was capable of taking any order, including one to take himself apart (given by Parker, naturally). He put himself back together, turned inexplicably evil, and formed the "Model Employee Circuit" by taking over Parker's brain. He eventually was thrown into the fryer by Parker (who overrode Chip when he said "we never eat"), and melted.   
Eddie: Parker's pet yeti who only worked at Mr. Meaty's for a little bit, but was shipped back to the Himalayas. He only came out in "My Eddie."

Pantosphere Staff   
Ashley Steinberg Her best friends are Brittney and Ashley 2. She seems to be the leader of the trio. Though she hates Josh, she agrees to go out with him at times. In the episode "Schnozzola" it's revealed that her last name is Steinberg.  
Brittney Of the three, she seems to have the most common sense and is almost always there to offer advice to Josh and Parker. She often goes out on dates with Josh.   
Art"ee"st Woman The owner of Pantosphere.

Sparkle City Movie Theater Staff   
Ashley 2 She and Brittney are followers of Ashley.    
Goth Girl She is a goth who went on a date with Josh to see the premiere of Star Raiders IV. She always wears black and still shows some interest in Josh. She can't stand violence. According to a Nick Extra on Nickelodeon, she longs to be bitten by a sensitive vampire.

Soy What? Staff   
The entire Soy What? staff, as seen in "The Fries that Bind", consisted of a cult of cannibals. Gord was their leader, but after his not helping them fight off Josh and Parker, they left to work at Mr. Meaty. It is unknown if this applies after the end of the episode, so it is up to speculation if this episode is truly cannon.   
Gord He wears his blond hair in beaded dreadlocks.   
Peace Woman
Peace Man   
Ceremonial Singers

ChopShtick Staff   
Ping: An employee who teaches Josh and Parker to be ninjas. Unfortunately, they use their ninja abilities for revenge. At this time, it is discovered that he has taught much of the mall ninjutsu (They were taught for ordering his food). So after stopping them, he makes them eat a "Chicken Ball of Dishonor" that makes them forget everything that happened to them since they learned ninjutsu from him.

Security
Doug: a beefy security guard with a buzz haircut, black shades, and a prominent bottom lip. He speaks with a macho attitude and is very dedicated to his job. He can be friendly to the kids of the mall or pretty aggressive to trouble makers. He thwarts the Wegelor by going "commando" that day to work. He is terrified of zombies, and was trained in the martial arts (presumably by the ninja that works at Chop Shtick). He seems to have a liking towards Josh and Parker, and wanted to be a hero to them (to the point of lying by pretend that he fought an army of zombies and even helped them with their movie). In the far future, Doug will become the president.   
R.O.B.: R.O.B. is the Mr. Meaty security bot who only appeared in "Buffalo Burrito," in which he was lurking around the mall zapping people and repeating, "Please clear the area."

Against Josh Group   
Ashley Steinberg: the long haired brunette with the pink hair clip, light purple long sleeve shirt, braces, and pink eye shadow. Ashley is very concerned with her looks and can go to extreme lengths to preserve them. Once, when so worried about a large pimple, she asked Josh and Parker for help removing it, only for them to remove her nose and then fry it and lose it to a huge hungry rat. Still we know that she dislikes Josh, right? Yet she still agrees to go on dates with him.   
Ashley 2: a member of the girl group of Scaunchburo Mall. She has long curly blonde hair clipped back, pink clothing and pink makeup. She speaks with a nasally voice and chews on her hair when nervous. Ashley 2 is also not very bright (she thought Parker was a magic genie when all the food he attempted to eat vanished when it was in fact a super fast tapeworm emerging from his mouth to eat the food before he could). Ashley 2 loves frogs and toads.   
Brittany: the most reasonable and apparently liked girl of Scaunchburo Mall. She has curly brown hair with gold tints, a pink tank top, and blue skirt. Britney lends advice to others and is always calm and soft-spoken. When Ashley Steinberg got a big zit, she tried to comfort her friend by telling her that everyone gets zits and that she should just leave it alone. One time, when Brittany emerged from a crowd of spectators during a fight between Josh and Parker, a heavenly light shone on her as she lent advice.    
Tanya: a thick lipped girl with black shades and long dirty blonde hair. She wears a red vest and carries a purse. She once dated Josh who asked to borrow her hair crimper but didn't give it back and after they broke up.   
Parkerina: (female version of Parker), Parkerina. Parker dressed in a cowgirl outfit, two red pigtails over his shoulders and with notable eyelashes. After consuming a dozen Ms. Meaty burgers, he turned into a female version of himself. Josh used this to try to learn why the girls in the mall were ignoring him. This plan backfired when an increasingly feminine Parker rallied the girls of the mall to confront Josh who were mooched by him.   
Natasha: A European (probably Russian, due to her accent) member of the Against Josh Group who appears on the screen during the Against Josh Group meeting in "Parkerina". During her time on the screen she is constantly crossing and recrossing her legs.   
Sky: a member of the girl's group. She has short red hair, red lipstick and wears a black long sleeve shirt with a red vest. The other girls, mostly Ashley Steinberg, blame her for their misfortunes to which she automatically agrees to.

Bullies
Ken: Josh's older brother who is extremely annoying. He has long blond hair and moustache. Despite the constant bullying of his brother, he and Josh are very similar in their characteristics.    
Darryl: Ken's best friend and his bodyguard. Darryl enjoys hockey and is sometimes insecure about his looks. Ken also calls him "Darry" sometimes.

Other Characters   
Tyrone Provides the music for The Tater Tots so they can break dance.   
Tater Tots Three 8-year-old Hip-Hop gangster brats. They tried to win Scaunchboro Mall as "Tater Turf" by break-dancing. They lost to Parker. Their nickname for Josh is "Skinny Butt". At one point The Tater Tots called Josh "Noodle Man" and "Mr. Skinny Butt" and in "Tater Turf" they called Parker "Kid" after they lost the re-match for the Break Dancing contest they challenged Josh to. They enjoy picking on Josh and giving him a Wedgie. At one point The Tater Tots called Parker "Parker Stinkleman". Their catch phrase is, "Oh no!".   
Hamish Parker's other best friend. Technically, he didn't work at Mr. Meaty, but he was in the episode of the same name. Hamish was actually a piece of ham made with other foods as well, and Parker befriended him because Josh neglected him.   
Natalie, "Noseferateens" A little vampire girl discovered in the freezer. She turned Parker and Josh into vampires.   
Barb Josh's ex girlfriend made of meat. Josh used DNA from Ashley, Brittney, Ashley 2, and himself to make her. At first, Josh didn't want to be seen with her, but he soon accepted her as his girlfriend. They were both happy together until she dumped him for a side of beef, saying "he" was so much hotter than Josh.
Leanne, Parker's girlfriend
Brandon DuBois III, He is a Parker's friend.
Gavin, He is a Parker's friend.
Karlon Bugosi, He is a former actor who has now become a brain-eating zombie. Bugosi only appeared in "Dream of the Dead", in which he was the main antagonist and anti-hero.
Lucas E. Romero, He is a horror movie director who only appeared in "Dream of the Dead."

Lists of American sitcom television characters
Lists of Canadian television series characters
Lists of American television series characters
Television characters introduced in 2006